Gérard Jaquet (12 January 1916 – 13 April 2013) was a French politician.

Jaquet was born in Malakoff.  He represented the French Section of the Workers' International (SFIO) in the Constituent Assembly elected in 1945, in the Constituent Assembly elected in 1946 and in the National Assembly from 1946 to 1958. He was Minister of Overseas France from 1957 to 1958.

References

http://www.assemblee-nationale.fr/sycomore/

1916 births
2013 deaths
People from Malakoff
Politicians from Île-de-France
French Section of the Workers' International politicians
Socialist Party (France) politicians
French Ministers of Overseas France
Members of the Constituent Assembly of France (1945)
Members of the Constituent Assembly of France (1946)
Deputies of the 1st National Assembly of the French Fourth Republic
Deputies of the 2nd National Assembly of the French Fourth Republic
Deputies of the 3rd National Assembly of the French Fourth Republic
French people of the Algerian War